Alan G. "Al" Kerr (born March 28, 1964) is a Canadian retired ice hockey forward. He is currently the head coach and general manager of the Alberni Valley Bulldogs BCHL team.

Kerr started his National Hockey League career with the New York Islanders in 1984. He also played for the Detroit Red Wings and Winnipeg Jets. He left the NHL after the 1993 season.

Career statistics

Awards
 WHL West First All-Star Team – 1984

External links 

1964 births
Living people
Seattle Breakers players
Detroit Red Wings players
Ice hockey people from British Columbia
New York Islanders draft picks
New York Islanders players
Winnipeg Jets (1979–1996) players
Springfield Indians players
Capital District Islanders players
Moncton Hawks players
Canadian ice hockey right wingers